Rittewada (ฤทธิเทวดา) is a Muay Thai fighter and amateur boxer.

Titles and accomplishments
Lumpinee Stadium
 2017 Lumpinee Stadium 140 lbs Champion

World Muay Thai Council
 2016 WMC World 140 lbs Champion

Channel 7 Boxing Stadium
 2014 Channel 7 Boxing Stadium Fighter of the Year
 2014 Channel 7 Boxing Stadium 140 lbs Champion
 2014 Channel 7 Boxing Stadium Fight of the Year (vs. Yodpanomrung Jitmuangnon)

Fight record

|-  style="background:#;"
| 2023-03-11||  ||align=left| Alessio Malatesta || RWS + Petchyindee, Rajadamnern Stadium || Bangkok, Thailand ||  ||  || 
|-  style="background:#fbb;"
| 2022-12-09 || Loss ||align=left| Fabio VenumMuaythai || Rajadamnern World Series || Bangkok, Thailand || KO (Punches + high kick) || 1 || 2:51
|- style="background:#fbb;"
| 2022-08-26|| Loss  ||align=left| Saemapetch Fairtex || ONE 160: Ok vs. Lee 2 || Kallang, Singapore || KO (Left cross)|| 2 || 1:36
|-  style="background:#cfc;"
| 2021-11-12|| Win ||align=left| Saemapetch Fairtex || ONE Championship: NextGen II || Kallang, Singapore || TKO (Doctor stop./Left elbow) || 2 || 2:10
|-  style="background:#fbb;"
| 2021-03-14|| Loss ||align=left| Ferrari Fairtex || Channel 7 Boxing Stadium || Bangkok, Thailand || Decision|| 5 || 3:00
|-  style="background:#cfc;"
| 2020-12-18|| Win ||align=left| Lobo PhuketFightClub || Suk Singmawin || Songkhla, Thailand || KO (left elbow) || 2 ||
|-  style="background:#CCFFCC;"
| 2020-09-20|| Win ||align=left| Ömer Semet|| Muay Thai Super Champ || Bangkok, Thailand || KO (Body Kick) || 1 ||
|-  style="background:#CCFFCC;"
| 2020-08-02|| Win ||align=left| Danilo Reis || Muay Thai Super Champ || Bangkok, Thailand || TKO (Doctor stop./Elbow) || 2 ||
|-  style="background:#CCFFCC;"
| 2019-11-30|| Win ||align=left| Hu Zheng || Wu Lin Feng 2019: WLF -67kg World Cup 2019-2020 6th Group Stage || Zhengzhou, China || Decision (Unanimous) ||3  ||3:00
|- style="background:#FFBBBB;"
| 2018-04-10 || Loss ||align=left| Rambo Pet Por Tor Or || Kiatpetch Super Fight Roadshow + Sawansangmanja || Khon Kaen, Thailand || Decision || 5 || 3:00
|- style="background:#FFBBBB;"
| 2018-02-16 || Loss ||align=left| Chujaroen Dabransarakarm || Muaythai Kiatphet Superfight || Thailand || Decision || 5 || 3:00
|- style="background:#CCFFCC;"
| 2018-01-09 || Win ||align=left| Nontakit Tor.Morsi || Lumpinee Stadium || Thailand || TKO (Low kicks) || 3 ||
|- style="background:#CCFFCC;"
| 2017-11-07 || Win ||align=left| Nontakit Tor.Morsi || Lumpinee Stadium || Thailand || KO (Elbow) || 3 || 
|-
! style=background:white colspan=9 |
|- style="background:#c5d2ea;"
| 2017-09-05 || Draw ||align=left| Nontakit Tor.Morsi || Lumpinee Stadium || Thailand || Decision || 5 || 3:00
|-
! style=background:white colspan=9 |
|- style="background:#FFBBBB;"
| 2017-08-12 || Loss ||align=left| Chujaroen Dabransarakarm || Lumpinee Stadium || Bangkok, Thailand || Decision || 5 || 3:00
|- style="background:#FFBBBB;"
| 2017-07-17 || Loss ||align=left| Chujaroen Dabransarakarm || Lumpinee Stadium || Bangkok, Thailand || Decision || 5 || 3:00
|- style="background:#CCFFCC;"
| 2017-06-29 || Win ||align=left| Morgan Adrar || Best Of Siam XI || France || TKO (Leg injury)|| 2 ||
|- style="background:#CCFFCC;"
| 2017-06-09 || Win ||align=left| Thaksinlek Kiatniwat || Lumpinee Stadium || Bangkok, Thailand || KO (Right hook) || 3 ||
|- style="background:#FFBBBB;"
| 2017-05-05 || Loss ||align=left| Chujaroen Dabransarakarm || Lumpinee Stadium || Bangkok, Thailand || Decision || 5 || 3:00
|-  style="background:#FFBBBB;"
| 2017-03-07 || Loss ||align=left| Yodpanomrung Jitmuangnon || Lumpinee Stadium || Bangkok, Thailand || Decision  || 5 || 3:00
|-
! style=background:white colspan=9 |
|- style="background:#CCFFCC;"
| 2017-02-11 || Win ||align=left| Nontakit Tor.Morsi || Lumpinee Stadium || Bangkok, Thailand || Decision || 5 || 3:00
|- style="background:#CCFFCC;"
| 2017-01-24 || Win ||align=left| Nontakit Tor.Morsi || Lumpinee Stadium || Bangkok, Thailand || Decision || 5 || 3:00
|- style="background:#CCFFCC;"
| 2016-10-04 || Win ||align=left| Chujaroen Dabransarakarm || Lumpinee Stadium || Thailand || Decision || 5 || 3:00
|-  style="background:#FFBBBB;"
| 2016-07-31 || Loss ||align=left| Yodpanomrung Jitmuangnon || Channel 7 Boxing Stadium || Bangkok, Thailand || Decision  || 5 || 3:00
|-
! style=background:white colspan=9 |
|-  style="background:#FFBBBB;"
| 2016-07-01 || Loss ||align=left| Manasak Sitniwat || 80th Anniversary Commemoration Stadium || Nakhon Ratchasima Province, Thailand || Decision  || 5 || 3:00
|-  style="background:#FFBBBB;"
| 2016-06-03 || Loss ||align=left| Yodpanomrung Jitmuangnon || Lumpinee Stadium || Bangkok, Thailand || Decision  || 5 || 3:00
|-
! style=background:white colspan=9 | 
|-  style="background:#CCFFCC;"
| 2016-04-29|| Win ||align=left| Yodwicha Por Boonsit || Ruamphonkhonpadriew Fights, Lumpini Stadium || Bangkok, Thailand || Decision || 5 || 3:00
|-
! style=background:white colspan=9 | 
|-  style="background:#CCFFCC;"
| 2016-04-06 || Win ||align=left| Saensatharn P.K. Saenchai Muaythaigym ||  || Chiang Mai, Thailand || KO || 4 ||
|-  style="background:#CCFFCC;"
| 2016-03-07 || Win ||align=left| Yodpanomrung Jitmuangnon ||  || Thailand || Decision  || 5 || 3:00
|-  style="background:#CCFFCC;"
| 2016-02-20|| Win ||align=left| Pakorn PKSaenchaimuaythaigym || Siam Warriors || Ireland || Decision || 5 || 3:00
|-  style="background:#FFBBBB;"
| 2016-01-22 || Loss ||align=left| Manasak Sitniwat ||  || Buriram, Thailand || TKO (Referee stoppage) || 5 || 
|-  style="background:#CCFFCC;"
| 2015-12-12|| Win ||align=left| Saensatharn P.K. Saenchai Muaythaigym ||  || Roi Et Province, Thailand || Decision || 5 || 3:00
|-  style="background:#CCFFCC;"
| 2015-11-10|| Win ||align=left| Yodwicha Por Boonsit|| Petkiatpet Fights, Lumpini Stadium || Bangkok, Thailand || Decision || 5 || 3:00
|-  style="background:#CCFFCC;"
| 2015-10-13|| Win ||align=left| Manasak Sitniwat || Lumpinee Stadium || Bangkok, Thailand || Decision || 5 || 3:00
|-  style="background:#CCFFCC;"
| 2015-09-12|| Win ||align=left| Fabio Di Marco || The Circle || Spain || Decision || 5 || 3:00
|-  style="background:#CCFFCC;"
| 2015-07-29 || Win ||align=left| Por.Tor.Thor. Petchrungruang ||  || Songkla, Thailand || Decision || 5 || 3:00
|-  style="background:#FFBBBB;"
| 2015-06-05 || Loss ||align=left| Yodpanomrung Jitmuangnon || Lumpinee Stadium || Bangkok, Thailand || TKO (Knees)|| 4 ||
|-  style="background:#CCFFCC;"
| 2015-04-28 || Win ||align=left| Saksongkarm Popthirathum ||  || Thailand || Decision || 5 || 3:00
|-  style="background:#CCFFCC;"
| 2015-02-27 || Win ||align=left| Simanoot Sor.Sarinya ||  || Thailand || KO (Elbow) || 3 ||
|-  style="background:#CCFFCC;"
| 2014-11-16 || Win ||align=left| Saksongkarm Popthirathum || Channel 7 Boxing Stadium || Bangkok, Thailand || Decision || 5 || 3:00
|-  style="background:#FFBBBB;"
| 2014-09-21 || Loss ||align=left| Yodpanomrung Jitmuangnon || Channel 7 Boxing Stadium || Bangkok, Thailand || Decision || 5 || 3:00
|-  style="background:#CCFFCC;"
| 2014-07-27 || Win ||align=left| Destar Chengsimeewgym || Channel 7 Boxing Stadium|| Bangkok, Thailand || KO (Elbow) || 2 || 
|-
! style=background:white colspan=9 | 
|-  style="background:#CCFFCC;"
| 2014-06-04 || Win ||align=left| Simanoot Sor.Sarinya ||  || Thailand || Decision || 5 || 3:00
|-  style="background:#CCFFCC;"
| 2014-05-16 || Win ||align=left| Saksongkram Popthiratham || Channel 7 Boxing Stadium || Bangkok, Thailand || Decision || 5 || 3:00
|-  style="background:#FFBBBB;"
| 2012-05-02 || Loss ||align=left| Bagkjo Torjinmaprayun || Rajadamnern Stadium || Thailand || KO (Right Cross) || 2 ||
|-  style="background:#FFBBBB;"
| 2012-03-28 || Loss ||align=left| Kiatisak Sitaudpibun|| Rajadamnern Stadium || Thailand || Decision || 5 || 3:00
|-  style="background:#FFBBBB;"
| 2011-07-29 || Loss ||align=left| Songkom Sakhomsin || Lumpinee Stadium || Thailand || TKO || 2 ||
|-  style="background:#FFBBBB;"
| 2011-04-26 || Loss ||align=left| Petsakon F.A.Group || Lumpinee Stadium || Thailand || Decision || 5 || 3:00
|-  style="background:#CCFFCC;"
| 2011-03-25 || Win ||align=left| Kotee Sitnumkabuan || Lumpinee Stadium || Thailand || Decision || 5 || 3:00
|-  style="background:#CCFFCC;"
| 2010-12-29 || Win ||align=left| Superlek Kiatmuu9 || Lumpinee Stadium || Bangkok, Thailand || Decision || 5 || 3:00
|-  style="background:#CCFFCC;"
| 2010-10-23 || Win ||align=left| Klasiam Sor. Jor. Montree ||  || Thailand || Decision || 5 || 3:00
|-  style="background:#CCFFCC;"
| 2010-09-17 || Win ||align=left| Vittayalek Sor.Weeraphol || Lumpinee Stadium || Thailand || Decision || 5 || 3:00
|-  style="background:#CCFFCC;"
| 2010-08-24 || Win ||align=left| Petchkiansa Sor.Weeraphol|| Lumpinee Stadium || Thailand || Decision || 5 || 3:00
|-  style="background:#FFBBBB;"
| 2010-07-13 || Loss ||align=left| Phet Lookmakarmwan || Lumpinee Stadium || Thailand || Decision || 5 || 3:00
|-  style="background:#FFBBBB;"
| 2010-06-19 || Loss ||align=left| Phet Lookmakarmwan || Lumpinee Stadium || Thailand || Decision || 5 || 3:00
|-  style="background:#CCFFCC;"
| 2009-08-07 || Win ||align=left| Wanchana Or.Boonchuay || Lumpinee Stadium || Thailand || Decision || 5 || 3:00
|-  style="background:#CCFFCC;"
| 2009-04-03 || Win ||align=left| Satanmuanglek Or.Satanmuang || Lumpinee Stadium || Thailand || Decision || 5 || 3:00
|-
| colspan=9 | Legend:

References

1996 births
Rittewada Petchyindee Academy
Petchyindee Academy, Rittewada
Living people